George Arthur Mackay (7 May 1906 – 7 May1981) was a rugby union player who represented Australia. He was born in Sydney, and attended Newington College (1919–1922).
Mackay was a fullback and claimed one international rugby cap for Australia in 1926. In later years he lived in Canberra and he died in Royal Canberra Hospital on his 75th birthday.

References

1906 births
1981 deaths
Australian rugby union players
Australia international rugby union players
People educated at Newington College
Rugby union players from Sydney
Rugby union fullbacks